San Diego Chargers song may refer to:
San Diego Super Chargers, the disco fight song of the San Diego Chargers
San Diego Chargers (song), the song by Plastilina Mosh